Mövenpick Resort Petra is located at the entrance of historic Petra in Wadi Musa in Jordan. It is about 110 km from King Hussein International Airport and 200 km from Queen Alia International Airport. The resort was opened in 1996 and is classified a 5-star hotel.

The hotel features an oriental-Islamic architecture style, where natural stones and hand-crafted woodwork is merged. Islamic architecture is noticed in the interior designs. The hotel includes 183 rooms and suites and 7 restaurants. The architect was Rasem Badran.

See also
 Zara Investment Holding
 Tourism in Jordan
 Petra

References

Hotels in Jordan
Tourism in Jordan
Petra
Hotels established in 1996
Hotel buildings completed in 1996